Lois Tochtrop is a former legislator in the U.S. state of Colorado. Elected to the Colorado State Senate as a Democrat, Tochtrop represented Senate District 24, which covers the northwestern portion of Adams County including Westminster, Northglenn, and portions of Thornton. Term limited, she did not seek re-election in 2014.

References

External links
 Senator Tochtrop's Page

Living people
1941 births
Colorado state senators
Women state legislators in Colorado
21st-century American politicians
21st-century American women politicians